Arrathorne is a hamlet and civil parish in the Richmondshire district of North Yorkshire, England. The name has been recorded variously as Ergthorn, Erchethorn, Erghethorn, Erethorn and Arrowthorne. It means The Thornbush by the Shieling. Historically, the hamlet was in the Parish of Patrick Brompton in the Wapentake of Hang East.

The nearest city to Arrathorne is Ripon. According to the 2001 census it had a population of 61. The population in 2011 census was 90 with an estimated population of the same number in 2015. It has neither pub nor public telephone box and is not on a bus route. The nearest bus stop is in Hunton, just over a mile away.

There is one recorded descriptive gazetteer entry, in John Bartholomew's Gazetteer of the British Isles, "Arrathorne, township, North-Riding Yorkshire, 5 miles NE. of Leyburn, 671 ac., pop. 62."

References

External links

Villages in North Yorkshire
Civil parishes in North Yorkshire